Thomas Baron ( 1938–1967) was an American aviation safety inspector.

Thomas Baron may also refer to:

 Thomas Baron (MP), MP for Newcastle-under-Lyme in 1421
 Tommy T. Baron, stage name of Tommy Vetterli from Coroner

See also
 
 Thomas Barron (disambiguation)